The Left-wing Revolutionary Nationalist Movement – 1 (abbreviated MNRI-1) was a political party in Bolivia, that emerged as a splinter-group of the Left-wing Revolutionary Nationalist Movement (MNRI) ahead of the 1985 elections. MNRI-1 was formed by a peasant sector. The presidential candidate of MNRI-1 was Francisco Figueroa and their candidate for vice president was Marcos Chuquimia. The Figueroa-Chuquimia ticket obtained 11,696 votes (0.78% of the national vote).

MNRI-1 disappeared shortly after the elections. In December 1984 it had changed name to Revolutionary Alliance Movement (Movimiento de la Alianza Revolucionaria, MAR). MAR proclaimed itself as the sole genuine left-wing party in the country, denouncing the Democratic and Popular Union as 'bourgeois'.

References

Defunct political parties in Bolivia
Left-wing parties in Bolivia
Nationalist parties in Bolivia
Revolutionary Nationalist Movement breakaway groups